Deo Raj, was a zamindari (estate) situated in what is now Aurangabad district of Bihar. The Deo Raj family were notable for being the protectors of Deo Sun shrine (Deo Surya Mandir).

Origins
In the 14th and 15th century, there was a migration of Sisodia Rajputs from Mewar to South Bihar. These migrant Rajputs along with local Hindu Rajas played an important role in freeing the numerous Hindu shrines and temples from the Muslim rule
 They eventually became the founders of the Deo Raj estate.

The Deo Rajas were among a number of Rajput migrant groups to arrive in Southern Bihar and they replaced the previous Umga chiefs who had fallen to Muslim invasion.

Relations with the British
The zamindars of the Deo estate generally maintained cordial relations with the British. They refused to join other rebellious zamindars in the 1781 rebellion and the 1857 rebellion. They also refused to join the nearby tribal uprisings including the Santhal rebellion. It is notable that the Rajas of Deo did not provide help to Kunwar Singh despite Raja Fateh Narayan Singh, the then ruler of Deo, marrying his daughter of to Kunwar Singh.

See also
Zamindars of Bihar

References

History of Bihar
Zamindari estates
Deo, Bihar
Rajput estates
Kingdoms of Bihar